The Dream Room was Erich Maria Remarque's first novel, published under the name Erich Remark.  He started writing it at the age of sixteen and completed it after his service in World War I, but it was not published until 1920.

When he published All Quiet on the Western Front in 1928, Remarque changed his middle name in memory of his mother and reverted to the earlier spelling of the family name to dissociate himself from Die Traumbude. The original family name, Remarque, had been changed to Remark by his grandfather in the 19th century.

References

1920 German-language novels
Novels by Erich Maria Remarque
1920 German novels
1920 debut novels